The Bisnovat (later Molniya) R-4 (NATO reporting name AA-5 'Ash') was an early Soviet long-range air-to-air missile. It was used primarily as the sole weapon of the Tupolev Tu-128 interceptor, matching its RP-S Smerch ('Tornado') radar.

History
Development of the R-4 began in 1959, initially designated as K-80 or R-80, entering operational service around 1963, together with Tu-128. Like many Soviet weapons, it was made in both semi-active radar homing (R-4R) and infrared-homing (R-4T) versions. Standard Soviet doctrine was to fire the weapons in SARH/IR pairs to increase the odds of a hit. Target altitude was from 8 to 21 km. Importantly for the slow-climbing Tu-128, the missile could be fired even from 8 km below the target.

In 1973 the weapon was modernized to R-4MR (SARH) / MT (IR) standard, with lower minimal target altitude (0.5–1 km), improved seeker performance, and compatibility with the upgraded RP-SM Smerch-M radar.

The R-4 survived in limited service until 1990, retiring along with the last Tu-128 aircraft.

Operators
 
 Soviet Air Defence Forces

Specifications (R-4T / R-4R)
 Length: (R-4T) 5.2 m (17 ft 1 in); (R-4R) 5.45 m (17 ft 10 in)
 Wingspan: 1300 mm (4 ft 3 in)
 Diameter: 310 mm (12.2 in)
 Launch weight: (R-4T) 480 kg (1,058 lb); (R-4R) 492.5 kg (1,086 lb)
 Speed:  Mach 1.6
 Range: (R-4T) 2–15 km (9.35 mi); (R-4R) 2–25 km
 Guidance: (R-4T) infrared homing; (R-4R) semi-active radar homing
 Warhead:  53 kg ( 116.6 lb) high explosive

References

External links
К-80, Р-4 - description in Russian, with pictures.

R-004
Cold War air-to-air missiles of the Soviet Union
Vympel NPO products
Military equipment introduced in the 1960s